Missing You is a folk song written by one of contemporary Irish songwriter Jimmy MacCarthy in the 1980s. This song has been popularized by Christy Moore.

References 

1980s songs
Year of song missing